Punjab Police Football Club (commonly known by its nickname "The Policemen") is an Indian institutional multi-sports club based in Jalandhar, Punjab. Affiliated with the Punjab Football Association, club's football section competes in the Punjab State Super Football League.

History
FC Punjab Police, governed by the Punjab Police, have an extremely proud past record of enjoying high status in sports and have produced talented players that have played in the National Team as well as the Indian football league. The club in 1965, reached the final of India's oldest football tournament Durand Cup, but went down 2–0 to Jarnail Singh led Mohun Bagan.

They have won lot of regional and state tournaments. Their first win was the Sait Nagjee Football Tournament in 1962 and most recent win was the Delhi Lt. Governor's Cup in 2006. However, the club's most cherishable win was the 1994–95 Punjab State Super Football League. In 2003 and 2005, they emerged as runners-up of the Guru Gobind Singh Trophy.

In 2021, Punjab Police participated in prestigious Birat Gold Cup of Nepal and entered into semifinals after 2–0 win against Machhindra. Later, they defeated Sankata Boys 1–0 in semi-final. In final on 17 April, the club suffered a 1–0 defeat to Nepal A.P.F. Club.

Rivalries
FC Punjab Police shares a rivalry with local side JCT Mills FC, which have emerged as the champions of the first ever National Football League (India). Both the clubs have witnessed the rivalry in the regional association football tournaments of Punjab.

Punjab Police had also enjoyed rivalries with two of other local sides Leaders Club (Jalandhar) and Border Security Force (football team).

Stadium

FC Punjab Police have used Guru Gobind Singh Stadium in Jalandhar for their seasonal home matches of the National Football League and Punjab State Super Football League.

Honours

International
Birat Gold Cup
Runners-up (1): 2021

Domestic
Durand Cup
Runners-up (2): 1965, 1979
National Football League II
Runners-up (1): 2000–01
 IFA Shield
Runners-up (1): 1987
 Punjab State Super Football League
Champions (2): 1994–95, 2020–21
Runners-up (2): 2019, 2022–23
Gurdarshan Memorial Cup
Champions (8): 1978, 1979, 1980, 1981, 1983, 1984, 1989, 2004
Hot Weather Football Championship
Champions (4): 1998, 1999, 2002, 2003
Runners-up (2): 1997, 2019
DCM Trophy
Champions (2): 1966, 1976
Sikkim Governor's Gold Cup
Champions (3): 1982, 1983, 1995
Delhi Lt. Governor's Cup
Champions (2): 2004, 2006
Shaheed-e-Azam Sardar Bhagat Singh Memorial Trophy
Champions (2): 2001, 2004
Sait Nagjee Football Tournament
Champions (1): 1962
Bordoloi Trophy
Champions (1): 1994
BN Mullick Police Cup
Champions (1): 1998
Manjit Memorial Football Tournament
Champions (1): 2000
Jarnail Singh Memorial Football Trophy
Champions (1): 2003
Rajiv Gandhi Memorial Trophy
Champions (1): 2003
Kohima Royal Gold Cup
Champions (1): 2001
Runners-up (1): 2002
Harbhajan Singh Memorial Trophy
Champions (1): 2004
Guru Gobind Singh Trophy
Runners-up (2): 2003, 2005
Independence Day Cup
Runners-up (1): 1988
Mohan Kumar Mangalam Football Tournament
Champions (3): 1991, 1998, 1999
Runners-up (2): 1993, 1997

Other department

Field hockey
Punjab Police has its hockey team, that participated in Beighton Cup, one of the oldest field hockey tournaments in the world. They also participated in Bombay Gold Cup.

Honours
 Beighton Cup
Champions (4): 1966, 1997, 2002, 2008
Runners-up (1): 1961
Bombay Gold Cup
Champions (5): 1959, 1963, 1979, 1988, 1999
Runners-up (2): 1962, 1978
Guru Tegh Bahadur Gold Cup
Runners-up (1): 1984
Surjit Memorial Hockey Tournament
Champions (6): 1985, 1986, 1995, 1997, 2000, 2017
Runners-up (4): 1993, 1996, 2001, 2004
Senior Nehru Hockey Tournament
Champions (7): 1976, 1980, 1982, 1994, 2002, 2003, 2004
Runners-up (6): 1975, 1978, 1985, 1986, 1996, 2019
 Aga Khan Gold Cup
 Champions (2): 1955, 1960
Runners-up (1): 1951

Performance in AFC competitions

 Asian Club Championship: 1 appearance
1971: Group Stage

See also
List of football clubs in Punjab
Indian football clubs in Asian competitions

References

Further reading

External links

Punjab Police FC at Sofascore (archived 14 January 2023)
 Indian Football – Punjab Police (archived 6 July 2002)
 Season ending Transfers 2006 (NFL India) (archived 18 October 2006)
  of the Punjab Police (archived 18 August 2000)

Football clubs in Punjab, India
Sport in Jalandhar
Police association football clubs in India
Association football clubs established in 1960
1960 establishments in East Punjab